Park Dong-Suk (born May 3, 1984) is a South Korean football player who recently played for FC Seoul, then known as Anyang LG Cheetahs and Gwangju Sangmu FC (military service).

Club career statistics 
As of end of 2008 season

External links
 

1984 births
Living people
Association football goalkeepers
South Korean footballers
Footballers at the 2004 Summer Olympics
Olympic footballers of South Korea
FC Seoul players
Gimcheon Sangmu FC players
K League 1 players
Sportspeople from South Gyeongsang Province
Ajou University alumni